Kire Ristevski (born 22 October 1990) is a Macedonian professional footballer who plays as a defender for Armenian Premier League club Pyunik and the North Macedonia national team.

Club career

Slavia Sofia
Ristevski signed with Slavia on 27 December 2013 on a two-year deal.

KF Tirana

On 9 January 2015, Ristevski returned in Albania by signing an 18-month contract with KF Tirana, becoming the third winner transfer of the club. He made his debut with the club on 8 February 2015 during the league match against Vllaznia Shkodër, help the team to win the match 1–0. He made 16 appearances, including 13 in league, during the second part of 2014–15 season, with Tirana who finished it in the fourth place and was eliminated in semi-finals of 2014–15 Albanian Cup against KF Laçi with the 1–0 aggregate.

He left the team after the end of the season, after claiming that he was not paid by the club during his six-month stay.

Rabotnički

During the 2015 summer transfer window, Ristevski signed with Macedonian side Rabotnički.

Pyunik
On 13 September 2022, Pyunik announced the signing of Ristevski.

Club statistics

Updated to games played as of 27 June 2020.

International career
He made his international debut for Macedonia on 5 March 2014, playing the last 13 minutes of a 2–1 friendly win against Latvia in Skopje. As of April 2020, he has earned a total of 38 caps, scoring no goals.

References

External links
Profile at Macedonian Football 
 
 

1990 births
Living people
Sportspeople from Bitola
Association football central defenders
Macedonian footballers
North Macedonia youth international footballers
North Macedonia under-21 international footballers
North Macedonia international footballers
FK Pelister players
KF Elbasani players
KF Bylis Ballsh players
PFC Slavia Sofia players
KF Tirana players
FK Rabotnički players
Vasas SC players
Újpest FC players
AEL Limassol players
Macedonian First Football League players
Kategoria Superiore players
First Professional Football League (Bulgaria) players
Nemzeti Bajnokság I players
Cypriot First Division players
UEFA Euro 2020 players
Macedonian expatriate footballers
Expatriate footballers in Albania
Macedonian expatriate sportspeople in Albania
Expatriate footballers in Bulgaria
Macedonian expatriate sportspeople in Bulgaria
Expatriate footballers in Hungary
Macedonian expatriate sportspeople in Hungary
Expatriate footballers in Cyprus
Macedonian expatriate sportspeople in Cyprus